The Abawiri language, is a Lakes Plain language of Papua, Indonesia. It is spoken in the village of Fuau, located along the Dijai River, a tributary to the Mamberamo River. Clouse tentatively included Abawiri and neighboring Taburta (Taworta) in an East Lakes Plain subgroup of the Lakes Plain family; due to the minimal data that was available on the languages at that time. With more data, the connection looks more secure.

Like other Lakes Plain languages, Abawiri is notable for being heavily tonal and for its lack of nasal consonants: there are no nasal or nasalized consonants or vowels, even allophonically.

Phonology 
Abawiri has sixteen obstruent consonants (eight plain and eight labialized), as well as one sonorant consonant /ɾ/. The consonant and vowel charts below show the phonemes, followed by their representations in the community orthography (in <brackets>) where that representation is different from the phoneme symbol.

Abawiri has seven vowels, including three high front vowels: /i/, /y/, and /i̝/.

References 

East Lakes Plain languages
Languages of western New Guinea